This is the list of episodes for Paddington Station 24/7 Series 1.

Episodes
<onlyinclude>

References

External links
 

2017 British television seasons